Alexandre de Juniac (born 10 November 1962) is a French businessman.

Career 
He previously served as the chairman and CEO of Air France (2011–2013) and CEO of Air France–KLM (2013–2016). He became Director General and CEO of the International Air Transport Association on 1 September 2016. He stood down from the role at the end of March 2021.

He previously served on the advisory board of the global artificial intelligence unicorn company Afiniti.

References

1962 births
Living people
Lycée Pasteur (Neuilly-sur-Seine) alumni
École Polytechnique alumni
École nationale d'administration alumni
Members of the Conseil d'État (France)
French chief executives
People from Neuilly-sur-Seine
Chevaliers of the Légion d'honneur
Air France–KLM
International Air Transport Association
20th-century French businesspeople
21st-century French businesspeople